Becicherecu Mic (or Kleinbetschkerek) is a commune in Timiș County, Romania. It is composed of a single village, Becicherecu Mic. It also included Dudeștii Noi until 2004, when it was split off to form a separate commune. Its name means "Small Becicherec", as opposed to the "Great Becicherec" (Becicherecu Mare in Romanian), located in Serbia and renamed Zrenjanin in 1946.

Location 
Becicherecu Mic is located 17 km northwest of Timișoara, on the national road DN6 Timișoara–Sânnicolau Mare–Cenad. It is also connected to the Timișoara–Cenad railway, which passes to the south, with the Pescărețul Mic station.

It borders Dudeștii Noi to the east, Hodoni to the north, Săcălaz to the southeast, Beregsău Mare to the south, Iecea Mică and Iecea Mare to the west and Biled to the northwest.

History 
Becicherecu Mic is mentioned as early as 1232 by the name terra Potkerequ. A hundred years later, in 1334, the parish of Pechkereky pays the Vatican the "papal tithe", a grant from believers to support armed action against pagans. During the Hungarian occupation, in 1462, the village is given to the Hagymásy family from Beregsău. During the Turkish occupation (1552–1716), the name of the settlement would have been Crucea ("cross"), the hearth of the village being probably located on the Cross Hill. After the reconquest of Banat by the Habsburg Empire, in 1717, the imperial administration records the settlement with the name Peschered, in Romanian Pescăreț ("pond with fish"). In 1723, in County Mercy's Karte des Temeswarer Banates (see online), the settlement appears for the first time under the name Becicherecu Mic. Its origin comes by rhotacism from the proper noun Pechereky, the name of a landowner. First German settlers arrive here in 1727. In 1748, 24 Romanian families brought from Transylvania were also colonized here. Between 1920–1925, the village was named Țichindeal, after scholar , born here in 1775.

Demographics 

Becicherecu Mic had a population of 2,853 inhabitants at the 2011 census, up 18% from the 2002 census. Most inhabitants are Romanians (83.49%), larger minorities being represented by Roma (2.8%), Serbs (1.79%), Hungarians (1.51%), Ukrainians (1.4%) and Germans (1.16%). For 7.43% of the population, ethnicity is unknown. The village was previously divided into four parts, although in recent decades the inhabitants have mixed: the "German bend" – towards the railway station, the "Serbian bend" – practically in the center of the village, the "Romanian bend" – around the Romanian church and the "Gypsy outskirts" or Chertiz, a group of specific houses, along with Serbs and Romanians. At the end of World War II many of the German inhabitants left the village because of Soviet occupation. The inhabitants traveled through Yugoslavia and Hungary for about seven weeks to get to Austria on 1 November 1944. The inhabitants were then assigned families to stay with. By religion, most inhabitants are Orthodox (76.41%), but there are also minorities of Roman Catholics (5.71%), Pentecostals (5.64%), Baptists (1.37%) and Serbian Orthodox (1.23%). For 7.85% of the population, religious affiliation is unknown.

Economy 
The economic activity is a consistent one, supported at local level by 223 firms active in fields such as agriculture, trade, production, software, construction and iron processing, among others.

The agricultural area of the commune consists of 3,464 ha of arable land on which cereals are grown: wheat, maize, barley, two-rowed barley, sunflower and rapeseed; 2 ha of orchards with fruit trees and pasture that covers an area of 418 ha.

Notable people 
  (1775–1818), priest, teacher and fabulist
 Aurel Șunda (b. 1957), footballer and manager

References 

Communes in Timiș County
Localities in Romanian Banat